Say Uncle is an independently produced 2005 black comedy film written and directed by Peter Paige. It stars Paige, Kathy Najimy, Anthony Clark, Melanie Lynskey, Gabrielle Union, and Lisa Edelstein. It began a limited theatrical release in the United States on June 23, 2006.

Plot
Paul (Peter Paige), a childlike artist, becomes upset when his godson's family moves from Oregon to Japan. Paul tries to compensate for his feeling of loss with visits to the neighborhood playground.

Paul's best friend Russell (Anthony Clark) tries to warn him what people might think if they see him hanging around their kids, but Paul doesn't quite see it that way.

As Russell predicted, soon Maggie (Kathy Najimy), a somewhat bigoted local mom, launches a crusade against the naive Paul, with an army of furious parents in town.

Cast
 Peter Paige as Paul Johnson
 Kathy Najimy as Maggie Butler
 Anthony Clark as Russell Trotter
 Melanie Lynskey as Susan
 Gabrielle Union as Elise Carter
 Lisa Edelstein as Sarah Faber
 Jim Ortlieb as David Berman

Notes
Say Uncle was filmed in Portland, Oregon during the summer of 2005. It had a tight production schedule of 18 days, and filming took place at 19 different locations.

New York Times reviewer Jeannette Catsoulis notes that the film's R rating is based on "two boys kissing, one naked-toddler photograph, some naughty words and a lot of bad art", although the MPAA's rating reads simply "Rated R for some language".

The film was distributed on a theater-by-theater basis. It opened in Los Angeles on June 23, 2006, and in Manhattan on June 30, 2006.

External links
 
 
 In Say Uncle, an Adult With an Unhealthy Attachment to the Playground, New York Times

2005 films
2005 comedy-drama films
Films set in Portland, Oregon
Films shot in Portland, Oregon
American black comedy films
American comedy-drama films
American independent films
2000s English-language films
2000s American films